Gabala Football Club, also spelled Qabala, is an Azerbaijani association football club representing Qabala in the Azerbaijan Premier League since 2006. Gabala has been the runner up in the Premier League three times and has won the national cup once, in 2019.

Gabala is one of the 2 teams that started the first qualifying round of the UEFA Europa League for 2 seasons and managed to move on to the group stage.

History
The club was founded under the name of Goy Gol on 3 July 1995, based in Goy Gol. On 1 September 2005, Goy Gol was registered in Gabala by the Ministry of Justice, before the AFFA registered the team as professional on 5 September of the same year. In the summer of 2006, the team moved from Goygol to Qabala, before the club changed its name to Gilan FK. Later, the club changed its name to Qəbələ FK on 31 August 2007.

On 10 May 2010, former Arsenal defender Tony Adams was appointed as new manager after signing a £1 million per year deal with the club. In his first season in charge Gabala finished at 7th place in Azerbaijan Premier League. In November 2011, Adams resigned from being Gabala's coach due to family problems.

Despite the appointment of managers like Fatih Kavlak and Ramiz Mammadov, the club couldn't reach a satisfactory position in the league and was struggling in the middle of the table for many years. On 29 May 2013, Yuri Semin was appointed as new manager after signing a £1 million per year deal with the club. In the same year, the club qualified for European cups for the first time in their history but lost to Neftchi Baku on penalties in the final of the Azerbaijan Cup.

In the 2015–16 season of the Europa League, they became the 3rd club from Azerbaijan to qualify for the group stage after Qarabag and Neftçi Baku. They eliminated Dinamo Tbilisi, Čukarički, Apollon Limassol and surprisingly Panathinaikos. They came 4th in their tough group of Borussia Dortmund, PAOK and FC Krasnodar. They got two points both from 0–0 draws against PAOK.

Following their defeat to Keşla in the 2017–18 Azerbaijan Cup Final, Roman Hryhorchuk left Gabala after his contract was not extended. On 30 May 2018, Gabala announced that Sanan Gurbanov had been appointed as the club's new manager on a two-year contract. On 31 August 2019, Gurbanov resigned as manager following Gabala's 4–0 defeat at home to Keşla. On 2 September 2019, Elmar Bakhshiyev was appointed as Gabala's manager.

League and cup history

European record

Notes
 1Q: First qualifying round
 2Q: Second qualifying round
 3Q: Third qualifying round
 PO: Play-off round
 Group: Group stage

Crest and colours

The club's crest includes Caucasus Mountains with a black crescent and red eight-pointed star, similar to Azerbaijani flag. It also includes 2005 which signifies the club's formation year.

Shirt sponsors and kit manufacturers
Gabala's traditional kit is composed of red shirts, black shorts and red socks. The club's first kit manufacturer was Erreà, until a two-year deal was agreed with Joma in 2013.

In August 2012, Gabala signed a one-year deal with the American multinational beverage corporation and manufacturer Pepsi, which will replace Hyundai as the shirt sponsor from the 2013–14 season.

In September 2015, Gabala signed a one-year deal with QafqaZ Hotels and Resorts.

On 31 January 2020, Gabala announced that dairy brand Milla would be the club's new title sponsor until the end of 2021.

Stadium

The club play their home matches at the Gabala City Stadium, an all-seater football stadium situated in Qabala.

As of 2007, predominantly due to UEFA requirements, the club proposed an extensive renovation of the stadium, which has since been in constant process of redevelopment. AFL Architects were appointed to design a new 15,000 capacity stadium and training facility in December 2008 after winning a limited design competition. Accommodation within the stadium will include hotel and conferencing facilities, as well as retail and corporate hospitality space, and a dramatic viewing deck at the top of the entrance tower. It is expected that the stadium was scheduled to open in 2014.

Supporters
Gabala has a large fanbase in relation to its comparative lack of success on the pitch. Gabala's fan base has fluctuated over the years with high crowds coinciding with the club's success in the Premier League so that the club now averages in the top four best home attendances in the country.

Players

Azerbaijani teams are limited to nine players without Azerbaijani citizenship. The squad list includes only the principal nationality of each player, several non-European players on the squad have dual citizenship with an EU country.

Current squad

"For recent transfers, see 2022–23 Gabala FK season, or List of Azerbaijan football transfers winter 2022–23".

Club officials

The Board of Directors

Coaching staff

Medical staff

Managers
Information correct as of match played 17 March 2023. Only competitive matches are counted.

Notes:

Individual records
Urfan Abbasov is Gabala's most capped player, with 259 appearances for the club. Players in bold signifies current Gabala player.

Top goalscorers

Most appearances

Presidential history

Honours
 Azerbaijan Cup
 Winners (1): 2018–19

 Azerbaijan First Division
 Winners (1): 2005–06

See also
Gabala Cup 2012

References

External links

Official website

Football clubs in Azerbaijan
Association football clubs established in 2005

2005 establishments in Azerbaijan